Beasdale may refer to:

 Glen Beasdale, a glen in the Highland region of Scotland
 Beasdale railway station, serving the glen